The 2001 MBNA Cal Ripken Jr. 400 was a NASCAR Winston Cup Series stock car race held on September 23, 2001, at Dover Downs International Speedway. The race was the 27th of the 2001 NASCAR Winston Cup Series season. The race is notable for being the first NASCAR Cup Series race run after the September 11 attacks.

Dale Jarrett of Robert Yates Racing won the pole position, while Dale Earnhardt, Inc.'s Dale Earnhardt Jr. led the most laps with 193 and won the race.

The race was the also first to be run against the National Football League regular season since the signing of the consolidated NASCAR TV contract which began in 2001.

First race since September 11

Following the September 11 attacks, NASCAR moved the previously-upcoming New Hampshire 300 at New Hampshire Motor Speedway to late November. The Craftsman Truck Series race at Texas Motor Speedway was postponed to early October. This schedule change made the MBNA Cal Ripken Jr. 400 the first race since the attacks.

To honor those killed in the attacks, fans were given American flags. During pre-race ceremonies, Lee Greenwood sang "God Bless the USA", and Tanya Tucker sang "God Bless America" and the national anthem. Greenwood praised the "raw emotion" felt from the fans, who sang along and chanted "U-S-A!" as he performed the song.

Baseball great Cal Ripken Jr. served as the grand marshal and had the race named for him as he was to play in his final game on the evening of the race in nearby Baltimore, Maryland. However, due to the attacks, his final game was postponed and was not on the same day of the race.

In a sense of patriotism, each car featured American flags. Ken Schrader removed every sponsor and decal from his car and completely painted the car as an American flag, a process that sponsor M&M's would recreate ten years later for Kyle Busch in the 2011 Wonderful Pistachios 400 at Richmond Raceway.

As a security measure, coolers, backpacks, and large bags were banned from the track, though concession prices were lowered in compensation. Volunteers from Dover Air Force Base assisted in scanning and inspecting every spectator entering the track, while Dover encouraged teams to not fly to the track. NASCAR on NBC helicopters were also prohibited from flying around the track.

Entry list

Qualifying

Race
Rick Mast, Jason Leffler, Lance Hooper, and Dave Marcis failed to qualify.

Labonte took the lead from Jarrett on the first lap before Jarrett reclaimed it on lap two. Dale Earnhardt Jr. became the leader on lap three and led until the first caution came out for Labonte and Bill Elliott crashing in turn two. Ricky Craven inherited the lead, which he maintained until Earnhardt retook it on lap 41. On lap 56, Jeremy Mayfield hit the turn two wall after his right front tire went down, causing him to lose consciousness. He was able to walk to the infield care center, suffering only a chipped tooth and minor bruises; NASCAR officials inspected Mayfield's car and found a partially torn left lap seat belt, which was damaged in the same fashion as Dale Earnhardt's in the Daytona 500 earlier that year, a major factor in his death. A Goodyear spokesman later stated Mayfield's tire was too damaged to determine what had happened.

Ricky Rudd led during the nine caution laps following Mayfield's wreck, though Earnhardt became the leader for the restart on lap 65, which he would hold for 104 laps. During Earnhardt's run, three more cautions occurred: Brett Bodine spun on lap 71, oil was found on the track on lap 117, and Mark Martin, Johnny Benson Jr., Ron Hornaday Jr., and Ward Burton all crashed on the front stretch on lap 130. Earnhardt lost the lead to Elliott Sadler during caution laps on lap 169, when Andy Houston had an accident in turn two. Tony Stewart also led three laps under the yellow flag until Earnhardt was cycled back into the lead for the green flag on lap 173. On lap 184, Rudd took the lead, holding it for a race-high 161 laps. Between the start and end of Rudd's lead, three yellow flags were waved: Michael Waltrip wrecked on lap 201, Robert Pressley crashed in turn one, and Dave Blaney fell victim to a broken seat belt on lap 268. With 140 laps remaining, Earnhardt had a slow pit stop and was relegated to eighth. He was able to recover from the error and was in third by lap 329. On lap 345, Rudd spun after making contact with Rusty Wallace, bringing out the caution and making Jarrett the new leader until Earnhardt passed him on lap 362. With 11 laps to go, Jarrett also had problems of his own as he spun on the backstretch for the final yellow of the race. Earnhardt held off Jerry Nadeau on the final restart to take the win. During the final lap, the white flag was not waved to signify the refusal to surrender. Nadeau finished second and Rudd in third, while Jeff Gordon and Tony Stewart rounded out the top five.

To honor the victims of the attack, Earnhardt drove a Polish victory lap with a large American flag. The win was described as the third time in 2001 in which Earnhardt had to "carry the emotional burden of the sport", after his father's death at the Daytona 500 and his victorious return to Daytona at the Pepsi 400. In Victory Lane, he stated he would donate $75,000 to relief efforts. Earnhardt added he would pledge $100 a lap and $10,000 for every pit stop under 14 seconds.

Results

Standings after the race

References

External links

MBNA Cal Ripken Jr. 400
MBNA Cal Ripken Jr. 400
NASCAR races at Dover Motor Speedway